Rathwell may refer to:

Rathwell, Manitoba, unincorporated urban centre
Jake Rathwell (born 1947), Canadian ice hockey player